Bobby Frazier (born January 20, 1943) is a former American football coach and player. He served as the head football coach at Bethune–Cookman University from 1979 through 1982 and at the University of the District of Columbia (UDC) from 1984 to 1989. As a head coach, Frazier compiled an overall record of 31 wins, 67 losses and 3 ties (31–67–3)

Frazier played quarterback for Bethune–Cookman from 1960 through 1963. During his career as the Wildcats' quarterback, he established many passing records with his 89-yard completion to George Williams against Benedict College in 1962 still being the longest pass play in the history of the program. Following his college career, Frazier played several seasons in minor league baseball, advancing as high as the Phoenix Giants of the Pacific Coast League before beginning his football coaching career.

After serving as an assistant coach from 1973 to 1978, on February 14, 1979, Frazier was promoted to head coach following the resignation of Andy Hinson. During his tenure as the Wildcats head coach, he compiled an overall record of 24 wins, 17 losses and 1 tie (24–17–1). He resigned his position in December 1982 following an internal investigation over player treatment and athletic funding.

In 1984, Frazier returned to the head coaching ranks for the UDC Firebirds. During his tenure from 1984 to 1989, he compiled an overall record of 7 wins, 50 losses and 2 ties (7–50–2). He was fired from his post following the 1989 season, with the UDC program being disbanded altogether for the 1990 season. Presently, Dr. Frazier is a professor at Edward Waters College in Jacksonville, Florida

Head coaching record

References

1943 births
Living people
American football quarterbacks
Bethune–Cookman Wildcats football coaches
Bethune–Cookman Wildcats football players
UDC Firebirds football coaches
Florida State University alumni
African-American coaches of American football
African-American players of American football
20th-century African-American sportspeople
21st-century African-American sportspeople